Brass Shout is an album by trumpeter Art Farmer, featuring a brass ensemble arranged and conducted by Benny Golson. Recorded in 1959, the album was originally released on the United Artists label.

Recording
The album was recorded in Nola Studies in New York City.

Reception
The Allmusic review stated: "Golson's well-crafted arrangements back Farmer's superb solos with flair". The Penguin Guide to Jazz commented: "the arrangements are fairly laid-back and use the ensemble rather sparingly, leaving lots of space for the featured horns".

Track listing
All compositions by Benny Golson, except as indicated
 "Nica's Dream" (Horace Silver) – 5:55   
 "Autumn Leaves" (Joseph Kosma, Jacques Prévert, Johnny Mercer) – 5:08   
 "Moanin'" (Bobby Timmons) – 5:47   
 "April in Paris" (Vernon Duke, E. Y. Harburg) – 4:00   
 "Five Spot After Dark" – 4:52   
 "Stella by Starlight" (Victor Young, Ned Washington) – 3:50   
 "Minor Vamp" – 3:54

Personnel

Musicians
The following played on most tracks:
Art Farmer, Lee Morgan, Ernie Royal – trumpet
Julius Watkins – French horn
Jimmy Cleveland, Curtis Fuller – trombone
James Haughton – baritone horn
Don Butterfield – tuba 
Percy Heath – bass
Philly Joe Jones – drums
Benny Golson – arranger and conductor

The following replacements or additions played on the stated tracks:
Wayne Andre – trombone on track 4, replacing Cleveland; and on tracks 1, 2, 6, replacing Haughton
Bob Northern – French horn on track 4, replacing Watkins
Bobby Timmons – piano on track 3
Elvin Jones – drums on tracks 1, 2, 6, replacing Philly Joe Jones

Production
Tom Wilson – production
Lew Merritt – recording engineering
Hugh Bell – photography

References

United Artists Records albums
Art Farmer albums
1959 albums
Albums arranged by Benny Golson
Albums produced by Tom Wilson (record producer)